Cathy Ann Rattray-Williams (born 19 August 1963) is a retired female sprinter from Jamaica, who mainly competed in the women's 400 metres during her career. She is a four-time Olympian, making her debut in 1980 (Moscow, Soviet Union).  She won 17 All-American honors while competing in college for the University of Tennessee.

International competitions

References

External links

1963 births
Living people
Jamaican female sprinters
Olympic athletes of Jamaica
Athletes (track and field) at the 1980 Summer Olympics
Athletes (track and field) at the 1984 Summer Olympics
Athletes (track and field) at the 1988 Summer Olympics
Athletes (track and field) at the 1992 Summer Olympics
People from Trelawny Parish
Athletes (track and field) at the 1983 Pan American Games
Athletes (track and field) at the 1987 Pan American Games
Athletes (track and field) at the 1991 Pan American Games
Athletes (track and field) at the 1982 Commonwealth Games
Commonwealth Games bronze medallists for Jamaica
Commonwealth Games medallists in athletics
Pan American Games medalists in athletics (track and field)
Pan American Games bronze medalists for Jamaica
Central American and Caribbean Games silver medalists for Jamaica
Central American and Caribbean Games bronze medalists for Jamaica
Competitors at the 1982 Central American and Caribbean Games
Competitors at the 1986 Central American and Caribbean Games
World Athletics Indoor Championships winners
Central American and Caribbean Games medalists in athletics
Competitors at the 1990 Goodwill Games
Medalists at the 1991 Pan American Games
Olympic female sprinters
20th-century Jamaican women
21st-century Jamaican women
Medallists at the 1982 Commonwealth Games